Lieutenant General Podali Shankar Rajeshwar PVSM, AVSM, VSM, ADC is a former General officer in the Indian Army. He last served as the 14th Commander-in-Chief, Andaman and Nicobar Command, from December 2019 to May 2020. He took office on 1 December 2019 when Vice Admiral Bimal Verma retired. He superannuated on 31 May 2020, handing over command to Lieutenant General Manoj Pande. Earlier, he had served as the 12th Chief of Integrated Defence Staff, from November 2018 to November 2019.

Early life and education 
Rajeshwar is an alumnus of Indian Military Academy, Dehradun and National Defence College, Delhi. He also holds a master's degree in national security administration from National Defense College, Philippines.

Career 
Rajeshwar was commissioned into the Indian army's Regiment of Artillery in December 1980. He has various operational experiences in high altitude areas, counter-insurgency areas in the North East, and counter-terrorist operations in Jammu and Kashmir. He has held commands of an artillery regiment during Operation Parakram, an infantry brigade at line of control, General-Officer-Commanding XII Corps, Director General of Perspective Planning at the Integrated Headquarters and GOC of Romeo Force in Jammu and Kashmir. He has also served in various United Nations Peacekeeping operations to Rwanda and Mozambique.

Rajeshwar served as 12th Chief of Integrated Defence Staff to the Chairman of the Chiefs of Staff Committee (CISC) of the Indian Armed Forces. He assumed the office on 1 November 2018 when Lieutenant General Satish Dua retired, and served in the same capacity till 30 November 2019 when Vice Admiral R. Hari Kumar took over.

Honours and decorations 
During 38 years of his career, he has been awarded Param Vishisht Seva Medal in January (2020), Ati Vishisht Seva Medal in January 2018 and Vishisht Seva Medal in January 2016 for his service.

Dates of rank

References

External links 

Living people
Indian generals
Recipients of the Ati Vishisht Seva Medal
Recipients of the Vishisht Seva Medal
Indian Army officers
1960 births
National Defence College, India alumni
Commanders-in-Chief, Andaman and Nicobar Command
Recipients of the Param Vishisht Seva Medal